The Tornado outbreak of August 24, 2006, was an outbreak of 14 tornadoes in North Dakota, South Dakota, and Minnesota on August 24, 2006. The outbreak spawned three F3 tornadoes, one of which caused a fatality in Kasota, Minnesota. The severe weather outbreak also produced many reports of severe hail which caused $130 million in damage across several states.

Outbreak description
A moderate risk of severe weather was issued by the SPC for August 24, with a significant threat for tornadoes, some of which could be strong. The main threat area ran from North Dakota southeastward into Minnesota and northern Iowa to western Wisconsin.

 
The tornadoes began about noon central time in North Dakota, with three tornadoes produced there. Then, during the mid-afternoon hours, 11 more tornadoes touched down, 9 of which were in South Dakota. Two of the tornadoes in South Dakota were rated F3 on the Fujita scale - one of which touched passed near the town of Wolsey and another near Eureka. The Wosley storm was one of four tornadoes spawned in the same area from Wessington to Cavour. The three others storms in Beadle County were rated from F0 to F2.

The most destructive tornado of the day was a  multiple vortex F3 tornado that hit the Minnesota cities of Nicollet and Kasota. It tracked a path of 33 miles, killed one person, and caused $30 million in damages.  This tornado passed near but did not hit the city of St. Peter, which was devastated by the 1998 Comfrey – St. Peter tornado outbreak.

Casualties and damage
One person, a 90-year-old man, was killed when he was pinned by a tree while inside a home in Kasota. Thirty-seven people were reported to have had injuries from that tornado.  Five others were injured in the remaining tornadoes on this day, and in all there was $44 million in damages.

Confirmed tornadoes

Non-tornadic events
A wider area, from Montana to Michigan was also affected by large hail storms throughout the day.  Southern Minnesota was especially hard hit, with hail to 4.25 in (10.8 cm) diameter reported in New Prague, and $50 million in property damage sustained in and around Northfield.  Two car dealerships in Northfield lost their entire inventory of vehicles.  In Minnesota there was $125 million in hail damage reported.

See also
List of North American tornadoes and tornado outbreaks
Tornadoes of 2006

References

External links
 SPC Convective Outlook, 2000Z

F3 tornadoes
Tornadoes of 2006
Tornadoes in Minnesota
Tornadoes in North Dakota
Tornadoes in South Dakota
2006 natural disasters in the United States
2006 in Minnesota
2006 in North Dakota
2006 in South Dakota
August 2006 events in the United States